Mad Mike may refer to:

As a nickname
Mike Banks (musician), American musician and record label co-founder
Mike Calvert (1913–1998), British Army lieutenant-colonel
Mad Mike Hoare (1919–2020), British mercenary leader
Mike Hughes (daredevil) (c. 1955–2020), American stuntman, flat Earth conspiracy theorist, and hobby rocket pilot
Mike Jones (motocross rider) (born 1966), American freestyle motocross competitor
Mike Milbury (born 1952), American sportscaster and former National Hockey League player, coach and general manager
"Mad" Mike Whiddett (born 1981), New Zealand drifting racer

Other uses
a pen name of Michael Z. Williamson (born 1967), science fiction and military fiction author
one of the villains in Power Rangers Turbo, a television series